Catoptria majorellus is a species of moth in the family Crambidae. It was described by Alexander Kirilow Drenowski in 1925 and is found in Bulgaria.

Subspecies
Catoptria majorellus is sometimes also treated as a subspecies of Catoptria biformellus.

References

Moths described in 1925
Crambini
Moths of Europe
Taxa named by Alexander Kirilow Drenowski